The Western Psychological Association (abbreviated WPA) is an American learned society dedicated to the study of psychology and other behavioral sciences. It is a regional association focused on the Western United States, and is affiliated with the American Psychological Association. It promotes psychological research through an annual conference, which it has held since its founding, and where psychologists read their research papers to one another. Reports from these conferences were originally published in Psychological Bulletin starting in 1924, and are now published in American Psychologist.

History
The Western Psychological Association was established in 1921 with fourteen members, and held its first meeting in August of that year. The meeting took place in Berkeley, California, and was held in conjunction with the Pacific division of the American Association for the Advancement of Science. At the meeting, members elected Lewis Terman and Edward Tolman as the Association's president and vice president, respectively. The organization's membership increased to 1,917 members by 1962.

References

External links

Psychology organizations based in the United States
Organizations established in 1921
Learned societies of the United States
1921 establishments in California
Organizations based in California
Psychological societies